Peterson Terrace is a gently inclined, mostly ice-free area (c. 1.5 square mile) between Gaisser Valley and LaBelle Valley in the Cruzen Range of Victoria Land. The terrace rises to 1250 m; 750 m above Barwick Valley and Lake Vashka, close southward. Named by the Advisory Committee on Antarctic Names in 2005 after Jeffrey B. Peterson, Physics Department, Carnegie Mellon University, who performed astrophysics research at the Amundsen–Scott South Pole Station for 14 field seasons (from 1988 to 2005).

References

Landforms of Victoria Land